Blobster is a video game developed by Swedish studio Divine Robot and published by Chillingo for iOS. The game is a physics based puzzler that utilizes both accelerometer and touch controls to guide a blob through levels of increasing complexity.

References

External links
 Game website
 Developer website
 Publisher website

2011 video games
IOS games
IOS-only games
Platform games
Video games developed in Sweden
Chillingo games